Fuad Mulahasanović (born 16 October 1952) is a Bosnian former professional footballer and current coach.

Notes

References

1952 births
Living people
Footballers from Sarajevo
Bosnia and Herzegovina footballers
Bosniaks of Bosnia and Herzegovina
Association football midfielders
Yugoslav First League players
FK Sloboda Tuzla players
Aris Thessaloniki F.C. players
Yugoslav footballers
Yugoslav expatriate footballers
Expatriate footballers in Greece
Yugoslav expatriate sportspeople in Greece